The Canton of Gaillon-Campagne is a former French canton located in the Eure department in the former region of Upper Normandy (now part of Normandy). It had 14,587 inhabitants (2012). It was established in 1985 as a part of the canton of Gaillon. Its seat was the town Gaillon, itself not part of the canton.

History

Composition 
The canton comprised the following communes:

Ailly
Autheuil-Authouillet
Bernieres-sur-Seine
Cailly-sur-Eure
Champenard
La Croix-Saint-Leufroy
Écardenville-sur-Eure
Fontaine-Bellenger
Fontaine-Heudebourg
Heudreville-sur-Eure
Saint-Aubin-sur-Gaillon
Saint-Étienne-sous-Bailleul
Saint-Julien-de-la-Liègue
Saint-Pierre-de-Bailleul
Saint-Pierre-la-Garenne
Sainte-Barbe-sur-Gaillon
Tosny
Venables
Vieux-Villez
Villers-sur-le-Roule

Demography

References

See also 

 Cantons of the Eure department

Former cantons of Eure